Linamon, officially the Municipality of Linamon (Maranao: Inged a Linamon;), is a 5th class municipality in the province of Lanao del Norte, Philippines. According to the 2020 census, it has a population of 21,269 people.

Historically, Linamon was a barangay in Iligan City until it became a separate municipality on January 13, 1960.

History
Originally and before Spain Invasion and later American Invasion, majority people living in Linamon were Maranao In folk story from the old leaders said, during Spain occupation, some of the leaders from the interior areas of lanao del norte they usually cross the beach of municipality of kolambogan to beach of Ozamis City by boat to abduct people living in other side and make them slaves or other said BISAYA in maranaw term. There was also a story that Mutia Family in Zamboanga del Norte and Misamis Occidental is originally came from Interior area in Lanao del Norte and even now still existing the story because of the great-great-great grandfather of their great-great grandfather of Mutia Families in Zamboanga del Norte and Misamis Occidental lifted a small one piece of book hanging in the center of the house and said to the children the forbidden and do not even touch of even open the book, and according to the claimed soon for many years when somebody open they saw writing but not familiar (Spanish language, English language), and some say that near to Arabic letters.

In long living and social process and sometimes in 1935 – 1944, under the National Land Settlement Administration (NLSA) of the Commonwealth Government, there was a Philippine House of Representatives proposal to utilize the Island of Mindanao and use some land to help the Philippine Government, and one of the opposition that time is Congressman Datu Salipada Khalid Pendatun. The proposal was approved and signed by President Manuel L. Quezon, he is the president that time. The settlers are compose of people have knowledge about skill job, Agri Technician, Engineers, Farming.

The settlers are compose of different people from the Islands of Visayas and Island Luzon that has knowledge and experience of Agriculture, Technical, Farming, Lumber, Carpenter etc. The first batch transport were landed to the following Areas:

In Lanao del Norte, the transport of settlers was peacefully successful due to the smooth negotiations with the Maranao Tribal Leaders and Land Lords. As Welcome sign, the Land lords has donate piece of land (piece of land before are more than 5 hectares) to start the settlers life as beginning of life. In long run and process, the family of settler works to the land owners and as a gift since they are very good workers, the land lord gave the small piece of land as a gift. Some say that, settlers trade they made the business to the land lord just few item exchange of lands. Some family of land lords marry the daughter of their workers which result and until the majority living in Lanao del Norte and Misamis Occidental has blood in Maranao Tribe (Muslim Blood).

On the hand, the settlement has going problem and conflict between Non-Muslim and Muslim when Martial Law is implemented.

Geography
It is bounded in the east by the Linamon River, the Larapan River and the municipality of Kauswagan in the west, municipality of Matungao in the south and facing Iligan Bay in the north.

Barangays
Linamon is politically subdivided into 8 barangays.
 Busque
 Larapan
 Magoong
 Napo
 Poblacion
 Purakan
 Robocon
 Samburon

Climate

Demographics

Economy

Tourism
The Tinago Falls, a waterfall on the Agus River at the village of Robocon, is one of the two outlets of Lake Lanao. It is "the main tourist attraction of the province".

Linamon is a coastal town of Lanao del Norte, where five of its eight barangays are situated along the Iligan Bay area, and is considered as the “Beach Capital of Lanao del Norte”, with beaches spanning from Barangay Poblacion to Barangay Samburon that comprises 16 established beach resorts.

Government
Mayors after People Power Revolution 1986:
 1986-1987, Teofilo T. Macapil
 1986 - 1992, Pedrinilo Amesola
 1992 - 2001, Alejandro Canoy-Alfeche
 2001 - 2007, Cherlito Macas
 2007 - 2016, Noel N. Deaño
 2016–present, Randy J. Macapil

References

External links
 Linamon Profile at the DTI Cities and Municipalities Competitive Index
 [ Philippine Standard Geographic Code]
Philippine Census Information
Official website of Linamon, Lanao del Norte
Local Governance Performance Management System

Municipalities of Lanao del Norte